Seismic Unix is an open source seismic utilities package which was supported by the Center for Wave Phenomena (CWP) at the Colorado School of Mines (CSM). Currently it is supported by John Stockwell.

History 

Einar Kjartansson began writing what is now called SU (the SY package) in the late 1970s while still a graduate student at Jon Claerbout's Stanford Exploration Project (SEP). He continued to expand the package while he was a professor at the University of Utah in the early eighties.  In 1984, during an extended visit to SEP Einar introduced SY to Shuki Ronen, then a graduate student at Stanford. Ronen further developed SY from 1984 to 1986.   Other students at SEP started to use it and contributed code and ideas.  SY was inspired by much other software developed at SEP and benefited from the foundations laid by Claerbout and many of his students; Rob Clayton, Stew Levin, Dave Hale, Jeff Thorson, Chuck Sword, and others who pioneered seismic processing on Unix in the seventies and early eighties.

In 1986, Shuki Ronen brought this work to the CWP at Colorado School of Mines during his one-year postdoctoral appointment there, Ronen aided Cohen in turning SU into a supportable and exportable product.

Chris Liner, while a student at the center, contributed to many of the graphics codes used in the pre-workstation (i.e., graphics terminal) age of  SU. Liner continues to promote the use of SU in his students' research at the University of Houston.

Craig Artley, now with the Landmark division of Halliburton, made major contributions to the graphics codes while still a student at CWP and continues to make significant contributions to the general package.

Dave Hale wrote several of the heavy lifting processing codes as well as most of the core scientific and graphics libraries.

John Stockwell's involvement with SU began in 1989. He was largely responsible for the Makefile in the package.  He has been the main contact for the project since the first public release of SU in September 1992 (Release 17).  After Jack Cohen's death in 1996, Stockwell assumed the role of principal investigator of the SU project and has since remained in that role. The number of lines of code have more than tripled in the 11 years.

There have been many contributors to SU over the past two decades.

Syntax 

The Seismic Unix routines run under the Unix terminal, and can get maximum efficiency when using it with Bourne shell (sh) or Bourne-again shell (bash) scripting techniques.

Simple routines 

Many of the programs run simply by a command on the terminal, for instance, to visualize a seismogram, as wiggle traces
$ suxwigb < seismogram.su
or as an image plot
$ suximage < seismogram.su

More elaborated routines 

It is also possible, to use bash features to elaborate more complex processing structures:

$ for ((i=1;i<=100;i++)); do \
> sufdmod2 < model.bin > output.mov nx=200 nz=300 tmax=5 xs=$i zs=0 hsfile=seismogram.$i.su \
> done

In the example above Seismic Unix will create 100 seismograms in 100 different source positions

SU Data 

Here will have an explanation of how SU data is, it's headers and how they are organized in a big SU file with more than one gather:

--header—data—header—data--...

SU Programs 

Seismic Unix has many of the processes needed on the geophysical processing. It is possible to use it to manipulate and create your own seismograms, and also to convert them between the SU standard file and the industry standard, the SEG Y.

Here you can find a list of the programs that the SU package has, with a brief description and a link to its help page.

Awards 

2002 - Society of Exploration Geophysicists Special Commendation 

1994 - University to Industry award from the Colorado chapter of the Technology Transfer Society

References

See also 
 SUguide Seismic Unix Install Guide (hosted in Brazilian page)
 Seismic Unix wiki
 New Seismic Unix wiki 2019

Seismology
Free science software
Colorado School of Mines